The Motorola Profile 300e is a mobile phone that was manufactured by Motorola in 1996. 
The Profile had the Motorola MicroTAC's battery and antenna. The "e" at the end of the name means that it had all of the special features as well as extended display. The phone had a "slim" 6V Nickel-Metal Hydride battery and a regular battery. With the slim battery, the phone was about an inch thick. It had a built-in antenna that was 5 inches long. 
For making calls, the phone had a SND button, and to end calls it had an end button. The Profile was one of the first cell phones  that had a passcode lock. The Profile was not a very popular 
cell phone.

Other Buttons
Other buttons on the Profile 300e were: RCL, STO, CLR, FCN, and up and down buttons for volume.

Display
The Profile 300e had an LED Display with 3 signal icons, 3 battery icons, an NS 
icon (No Service), an IU icon (In Use), and RM (Roaming). It had a 10-number display. When the 
phone was turned on, the screen would simply say "On". If the phone was locked it would say 
"Loc'd". When the phone was locked, the code was a 3-digit number—by default 1-2-3, or if not, the last 
three digits in the phone's number.

Features
The phone had 9 optional ringtones, an auto lock function, multikey answer (so you could answer with any key), a special emergency call option, an Auto Answer function (after two rings the phone would automatically answer itself), and several other features common on older Motorola phones.

profile 300